The Zoli Cabinet was the 12th cabinet of the Italian Republic, which held office from 20 May 1957 to 2 July 1958, for a total of 408 days, or 1 year, 1 months and 12 days.

The government obtained the confidence in the Senate on 4 June 1957, with 132 votes in favor and 93 against, and in the Chamber of Deputies on 7 June, with 560 votes in favor, 305 against and 11 abstentions.

This cabinet was the first one who has been supported by the neo-fascist Italian Social Movement; but Zoli, a strong anti-fascist, resigned the post of Prime Minister soon after it became clear that he would have needed to rely on the votes of the neo-fascists to form a majority in the Parliament. He was then convinced by President of the Republic, Giovanni Gronchi, to remain in the post until the natural dissolution of the Italian Parliament in 1958.

Composition

References

Italian governments
1957 establishments in Italy
1958 disestablishments in Italy
Cabinets established in 1957
Cabinets disestablished in 1958